Chanai Swabi (Pashto: چنئی سوابۍ  Urdu: چنئی صوابی) is a village of District Swabi. It is situated in Gadoon Amazai. Its tehsil is Topi. It is at least 45–50 km far from district swabi .

Languages and People 
Pashto is main language spoken in a dialect. Gujri and Punjabi Language (in Hindko dialect) are spoken by few. Urdu, the national language, is also spoken and understood.

The residents are referred to as Swabiwal. The Mandanr Yusufzai (Afghan tribe) subsection of the Yusufzai clan, Awan or Awanri (Pashtun) (Hasankhel, Hussain Khel, Sahib Khel) Malikdeen Khel the Khattack, Dilzak and few family of Gakhar tribe are also live in large area of the Swabi from Jahangira to nearby Swabi and the Jadoon tribe, which are Pashtuns, form a majority of the population.

Culture 
The culture is local and traditional.  It is known as Pakhtoon culture.

Major source of income is agriculture and people have their own lands. They also go out of town and work as a labor in every field. They migrate to abroad for high financial career.

Population 
The village is not overpopulated and its area is not congested. About 10,000 people live in the village and its surroundings. With the passage of time it increase day by day.

Villages in Pakistan
Swabi District